Rockmart is a town in Polk County, Georgia, United States. Its population was 4,732 at the 2020 census. It developed as a railroad depot town when the Southern Railway built a station in the area. The community was incorporated in 1872, and was named from abundant deposits of slate in the area. The Rockmart Downtown Historic District is listed on the National Register of Historic Places.

Geography
Most of the town is in Polk County; parts of it also stretch into Paulding County.

U.S. Route 278, and Georgia State Routes 101 and 113, are the major roads through the town. U.S. 278 runs from west to east as a northern bypass, leading southeast 15 mi (24 km) to Dallas and west 14 mi (23 km) to Cedartown, the Polk County seat. GA-101 runs along the northern bypass of the town with U.S. 278, leading north 20 mi (32 km) to Rome and southeast 8 mi (13 km) to Yorkville (concurrent with GA-113). GA-113 also follows U.S. 278/GA-101 along the northern bypass of the town, leading northeast 19 mi (31 km) to Cartersville and southeast to Yorkville (concurrent with GA-101).

Demographics

2020 census

As of the 2020 United States census, there were 4,732 people, 1,557 households, and 1,131 families residing in the city.

Economy
Beginning in the mid-1990s, Rockmart experienced a period of economic expansion. Growth in the form of new restaurants and casual dining, as well as retail shopping, came about as residential building increased. A Walmart Supercenter store was opened in the city in 2007.

Culture

Arts and theater
The Drama Department at Rockmart High School is known for its involvement with the community and every spring the advanced acting class performs at a GHSA One-act play competition. When the new Rockmart High School was constructed, performance space was not included. Instead, the Rockmart Thespians use the historic Rockmart Art Center Theatre for their productions. The department has produced many theatrical feats such as "Seussical," "Grease (musical)," and most recently "Hairspray (musical)." In October 2008, the Rockmart High School Thespians placed first at the Region AA One Act Competition with their performance of Godspell, as well as receiving the Best Actor award. The RHS Thespians then took the show to the State AA One Act Competition and placed 3rd out of four schools. In 2013, Rockmart Thespians placed first in the State AAA One Act Competition with a riveting production of the thriller When You Comin' Back, Red Ryder?.

Music
Another important addition to the performing arts in Rockmart is the Rockmart High Marching Yellow Jacket band. The band won a best in show at the 2006 and 2008 Golden River Marching Festival. In those competitions, both band and auxiliary sections (such as the drumline, tubas, colorguard and danceline) were regarded as being among the best in Northwest Georgia. RHS host the annual Yellow Jacket Classic band competition every year, and is well attended by bands all over the state.

Rockmart In the movies
The movie Irresistible produced by Jon Stewart was filmed in the Seaborn Jones Park, historic downtown Rockmart, and Rockmart Middle School. Downtown Rockmart was the location of the fictional Deerlaken, Wisconsin.

Parks and recreation
Parks and recreation areas in Rockmart include the Nathan Dean Complex, the Silver Comet Trail & Riverwalk Park, as well as Rockmart City Parks.

Government
Rockmart operates under a council-manager form of government. The city is divided into five council wards, each electing one member to the council. The city's mayor serves as chairman of the council, and is its sixth member. The mayor and council, together, appoint the city manager. Other appointed positions include the city clerk, city attorney, city auditor, and city court judge.

Education
The city of Rockmart is a part of the Polk County School District. It has one high school, Rockmart High School; one middle school, Rockmart Middle School; and two elementary schools, Eastside Elementary and Van Wert Elementary. Rockmart High School is the only high school in the city of Rockmart and serves the Aragon community as well. As of the 2011/12 school year, the school had an enrollment of 837 students and 50.10 classroom teachers (on an FTE basis), for a student-teacher ratio of 16.71.

In 1912, the Georgia Legislature created the public school system in the state of Georgia. That year, the city of Rockmart began the Rockmart School System in the building vacated by the Piedmont Institution (established in 1889 by the Methodist North Georgia Annual Conference). It had closed after a 23-year existence in 1912, after it was purchased by the Rockmart School Board of trustees. Rockmart High School was in the building until it burned down in 1915. The building was later rebuilt until the building burned down again in 1940. The current lot is now the Rockmart Governmental Complex.  Prior to the Polk County School System of Georgia, RHS had its own city school system and rival school Cedartown High School also had its own city school system in Cedartown.

The Polk County campus of Georgia Northwestern Technical College is also located in Rockmart.

Racial integration
Prior to the racial integration of the Polk County School System, two high schools existed in Rockmart—Rockmart High School and Elm Street High School—which served the African American community of Rockmart. The integration of the school system began in the year 1964 when some African American students began attending Rockmart High School until total integration was achieved in 1965 with the closing of Elm Street High School.

Transportation

Rail
The Southern Railway had two Mid-West to Florida named trains, Ponce de Leon and Royal Palm that made stops in the town into the 1960s. The Seaboard Air Line Railroad, had the Silver Comet, which made a stop in Rockmart on all trips between Atlanta and Birmingham. The Passenger and Mail #5 and #6 made stops in Rockmart, until it was cancelled in 1968. The Silver Comet continued on the merged Seaboard Coast Line, which discontinued the train on May 30, 1969.

Roads
U.S. Route 278 and Georgia State Route 6 run through the town.

Notable people
 Fred P. Branson (1881 - 1960), native of Rockmart, became Oklahoma attorney, judge and politician, served as Associate Justice of Oklahoma Supreme Court.
 Bill Calhoun, former Major League Baseball first baseman for the Boston Braves.
 Nathan Dean, former Georgia State Senator from the 31st District.
 Danny Ware, former running back for the NFL New York Giants.

See also
 Polk County, Georgia
 Rockmart High School

References

External links

 Official Website

Cities in Georgia (U.S. state)
Cities in Polk County, Georgia
1872 establishments in Georgia (U.S. state)
Populated places established in 1872